Adventures of the Gummi Bears is an American animated television series, created by Disney CEO Michael Eisner, produced by Walt Disney Television Animation, and distributed by Buena Vista Television. The series, loosely inspired by the gummy bear candies, takes place in a fantasy world of medieval lands and magic, and focuses on the lives of seven mystical beings known as Gummi Bears. The series focuses on the exploits of the main characters, as they tackle a series of problems, as well as aid their human friends and thwarting the plans of various evil characters. Episodes consisted of either a single story, or two 11-minute stories.

The lavishly budgeted series became iconic for not only spearheading the style of Disney animated series that followed, but also starting an era of artistic improvement in television animation spurred on its success with competitors forced to improve their own artistic standards to avoid unfavorable comparisons. The series was known for various elements, including its signature potion known as "gummiberry juice", and the theme music - written by Michael and Patty Silversher, performed by Joseph Williams. The animated series first premiered in the United States, running for six seasons between 1985 to 1991, with the show later sold to other countries including the United Kingdom.

Premise 
Adventures of the Gummi Bears takes place within a fantasy world of magic, monsters, and medieval living. 500 years before the events of the first episode, humans lived in peace alongside a race of beings known as Gummi bears - anthropomorphic bears with great skills in magic and technology. However, growing hostility from neighboring humans forced Gummi Bears to flee to safer lands across the sea, leaving small groups to mind their machinery, cities and ancient warrens in their absence. Over the years that followed, humans began to forget their existence, with the few remaining bears opting to become hidden from the sight of humans for their safety, eventually leading humans to believing that Gummi Bears are merely legends and portraying them as characters in children's fairy tales. For their part, the remaining Gummi Bears declined in population and technical expertise.

The series focuses on the lives of one small caretaker group, consisting of six Gummi Bears - Zummi, the elder of the group; Gruffi, a craftsman and mechanic; Grammi, a cook and mother to the younger members; Tummi, a slightly overweight, relaxed member; Sunni, a young female cub who wishes to enjoy her youth; and Cubbi, a young male cub seeking to become a knight. The group live within one of the Gummi Bear warrens called Gummi Glen, housed within an ancient tree and filled with a network of tunnels, rooms, and access to an ancient transport network known as Quick Tunnels. The group find themselves discovered by a human for a first time in the form of a young page named Cavin, whom they discover unconscious after being chased by ogres. Discovering he possesses an ancient Gummi medallion that can unlock the Great Book - an ancient manuscript containing the Gummi Bears' various laws and magic, and the chronicles of their good deeds - the group befriend Cavin, and eventually decide to assist anyone who needs help against wicked people even as they themselves strove to rediscover their heritage.

Alongside Cavin, the group also befriend Calla, a young adventurous princess from the page's home of Dunwyn Castle, and help the pair in protecting their kingdom from attacks by various villains. The most prominent villain the Gummi Bears face is Duke Igthorn, a former knight of Dunwyn who was exiled in disgrace for various misdeeds, who seeks revenge on the kingdom's ruler, King Gregor, by attacking his castle with an army of ogres. Being among the few humans aware of the Gummi Bears' actual existence, Igthorn will stop at nothing to exploit the lost civilization's secrets for his advantage. To help the Gummis in their battles against villains, alongside other matters and problems that arise, the group make use of a special potion called "Gummiberry Juice", which temporarily grants them the power to bounce and become elusive. Humans may also drink the juice, which temporarily grants them superhuman strength, but only once a day while the Gummis may use their juice as many times as needed.

Characters

 Zummi Gummi (voiced by Paul Winchell, Seasons 1–5; Jim Cummings, Season 6) - An aged bear who is the Gummi-Glen Gummies' leader, caretaker of Gummi Bear knowledge and wisdom, and a modest magician. Characterized to be somewhat forgetful with spells, speaking occasionally with mild spoonerisms, and having a fear of heights.
 Gruffi Gummi (voiced by Bill Scott, Season 1; Corey Burton, Seasons 2–6) - Gummi Glen's old-fashioned craftsman and mechanic, portrayed with slight rough mannerisms and views, but characterized as the voice of reason and a sound strategist for the group.
 Grammi Gummi (voiced by June Foray) - The matriarch of Gummi-Glen, responsible for cooking for the group, housework in their home, and preparing Gummiberry Juice through the secret recipe passed down to her.
 Tummi Gummi (voiced by Lorenzo Music) - An overweight Gummi bear cub, and the eldest of the three in the group. He is characterized as being relaxed, easygoing, and with a love of food, but possessing a number of notable talents when needed.
 Sunni Gummi (voiced by Katie Leigh) - A preteen Gummi bear cub, who exhibits a keen interest in human culture and fashion, rather than in Gummi history.
 Cubbi Gummi (voiced by Noelle North) - A young Gummi bear cub, the youngest of the three in Gummi Glen, who dreams of becoming a knight. He is characterized as being adventurous and somewhat impetuous, but with a open-mindedness to finding solutions to problems he faces.
 Cavin (voiced by Christian Jacobs, Season 1; Brett Johnson, Season 2; David Faustino, Season 3; Jason Marsden, Season 4–5; R.J. Williams, Season 6) - A young boy, serving as a page and squire in Dunwyn Castle. Cavin is the first human to encounter the Gummi Bears, and befriends them as a result of possessing a Gummi medallion that he leaves with Zummi, becoming friends with Cubbi over time. The character is portrayed in the series as courageous and good-hearted.
 Princess Calla (voiced by Noelle North) - A princess of Dunwyn, who is defiantly adventurous, capable of defending herself, despite her dislike of her circumstances and royal duties. She is friends with Cavin, and also becomes friends with Sunni after meeting the Gummi Bears during the first season. Calla is not included in the official Disney Princess line-up or in any of the merchandise. This is most likely due to the fact that she is from a TV series, whereas all of the official Disney Princesses come from films. In the two stories "Princess Problems" (first segment of Episode 45) and "May the Best Princess Win" (Episode 65),  she meets Princess Marie (voiced by Kath Soucie). 
 King Gregor (voiced by Michael Rye) - The king of Dunwyn, characterized as a benevolent, brave, and good ruler for his people. Like most humans, he believes Gummi Bears are myths, and thus does not know of their actions helping to protect his kingdom. However, he does discover his daughter's previously hidden fighting prowess towards the end of the series and is deeply impressed by her.
 Sir Tuxford (voiced by Bill Scott, Season 1; Roger C. Carmel, Season 2; Brian Cummings, Seasons 3–6) - The highest ranking knight in King Gregor's court and his trusted friend, as well as Cavin's superior. Characterized as being an old, jolly man despite being somewhat past his prime for battle.
 Duke Sigmund Igthorn (voiced by Michael Rye) - A disgraced knight of Dunwyn, exiled for conspiring against King Gregor, who leads an army of orges to attack the kingdom from his fortress of Castle Drekmore. Characterized as a vengeful, power-crazed tyrant, and the main antagonist of the series. A common element in stories he is involved in is his desire to find a suitable weapon for his plans, as well as capturing Gummi Bears for their Juice.
 Toadwart (voiced by Bill Scott, Season 1; Corey Burton, Seasons 2–6) - A midget orge, who serves as Igthorn's illeist lieutenant and second-in-command, often nicknamed Toadie. Characterized as being smarter than other orges, due to his ability to read and write. Affectionately sycophantic to the Duke, if only because associating with the Duke gives him some authority over the Ogres, who otherwise casually abuse him for fun.
 Augustus "Gusto" Gummi (voiced by Rob Paulsen) - An artistic Gummi Bear, stranded on a deserted island with his friend Artie Deco, a wise-talking toucan (voiced by Jymn Magon in his debut episode, Brian Cummings for the rest of the series), before taking residence near to Gummi Glen and aiding the other Gummi Bears when needed. Characterized as being an individualist with an outside-the-box problem solving ability.
 Lady Bane (Voiced by Tress MacNeille) - A human sorceress of considerable power, who maintains her youth magically and desires all of Gummi Bear magic for herself.
 Sir Thornberry (Voiced by Walker Edmiston) An aged Gummi Bear knight who acts as the caretaker of the otherwise isolated Gummi Bear city of Ursalia. His manner is eccentric by a probable combination of his extended isolation and senility, but still capable within his mental limits.
 Ursa (Voiced by Pat Musick) The statuesque female leader of the Barbics, a barbarian tribe of Gummi Bears driven from their native lands by humans and are scornful of orthodox Gummi traditions. She and her tribe take up residence in Ursalia at the Gummi Glen Gummies and Sir Thornberry's invitation.

Episodes

Broadcast
The series premiered on NBC on September 14, 1985, and aired there for four seasons. The series moved to ABC for one season from 1989 to 1990 (airing alongside The New Adventures of Winnie the Pooh as the Gummi Bears-Winnie the Pooh Hour) and concluded on September 6, 1991, as part of the Disney Afternoon television syndication package. The series was later rebroadcast on the Disney Afternoon block and rerun on the Disney Afternoon through the summer of 1991. In later years, it was shown on The Disney Channel (from October 7, 1991) to at least January 1997 and later on Toon Disney, with its most recent televised airing occurring on December 28, 2001. Seasons 1 to 3 of the series were released on DVD on November 14, 2006. On November 12, 2019, the series was released on Disney+.

Home media

VHS

International releases
Several VHS cassettes of the series were released internationally. Of those, eight cassettes containing 32 episodes are listed below. The first four cassettes ("Welcome to Gummiglen!", "Creature Feature", "Hot Little Tot!", and "A Sky Full of Gummies!"), which contain 20 episodes, were released in English in the United Kingdom, Australia, and New Zealand. These four cassettes were also released in some non-English-speaking countries (including Poland, the Netherlands and Germany). The other four cassettes, as well as the ones not listed below, were released exclusively in non-English-speaking countries (including the Netherlands, Poland, Finland, and Italy.)

DVD releases
On November 14, 2006, Walt Disney Home Entertainment released Disney's Adventures of the Gummi Bears: Volume 1 on DVD in Region 1. The 3-disc set features seasons 1 to 3 and does not contain any bonus features, save for subtitles for the hearing impaired.

To date, the series has never officially been released on DVD in the UK. However, since November 2016 the show has been available on the UK Disney streaming site DisneyLife.

In Australia, Disney released nine volumes, which have now long been discontinued. They are all in complete storyline production order, but the first volume starts from episode 19 in series 2. Episodes 1-18 have not been released on DVD in Australia and are only available on the USA Region 1 collection. However, the Region 4 Australian DVDs do finish off the series and go right up to episode 65 of the series' final two-part double episode adventure.

Video on demand
On November 12, 2019, the series became available to stream on Disney+.

Media adaptations

Comic strip
Gummi Bears was adapted into a daily newspaper comic, which ran from September 1, 1986, to April 1, 1989. The strip was written by Lee Nordling and illustrated by Rich Hoover.

Legacy

Disney's Adventures of the Gummi Bears was Disney's first major serialized animated television series (it was released back to back with another show, The Wuzzles, which lasted only 13 episodes), and is often credited as having helped jump start the television animation boom of the late 1980s and 1990s. Consequently, it also became the forerunner to Disney's famous Disney Afternoon timeslot, which gave way to other famous serialized Disney television series, such as DuckTales, Chip 'n Dale Rescue Rangers and Gargoyles. Although many of these subsequently-created shows exceeded Gummi Bears in budget and length, the show is often credited as a sort of prototype for all of the animation which followed it.

The show was so successful in the United Kingdom that the episodes "A New Beginning" and "Faster Than a Speeding Tummi" were released as theatrical featurettes there in 1986 and 1987, alongside The Great Mouse Detective and a re-release of Disney's Pinocchio.

Appearances of Gummi Bears in other media include one of Gruffi Gummi in a D-TV music video of the Elvis Presley song "Teddy Bear", in 1986.

The show's popularity led to a re-theming of Disneyland's Motor Boat Cruise, along with a small part of Disneyland that became known as "Disney Afternoon Avenue." The Motor Boat Cruise became the "Motor Boat Cruise to Gummi Glen" and plywood characters from the show made Gummiberry Juice along the waterway. The Gummi Bears have been featured as meetable characters who greet guests in Disney theme parks.

Cameos
 ALF (1987): In the TV Movie "Alf Loves a Mystery", Gummi Bears clips are interspersed.
 Darkwing Duck (1991–1992): In the episode "Life, the Negaverse and Everything", Zummi Gummi appears as a doll.
 Robot Chicken (2012): In the episode "In Bed Surrounded by Loved Ones", the Gummi Bears hold an intervention for Tummi's gummiberry juice addiction, though are disturbed when it is revealed that he is attracted to Sunni, which disgusts the other Gummi Bears. Tummi counters, pointing out none of them are related, which the other Gummi Bears save for Zummi and Tummi were unaware of. 
 The Goldbergs (2016): In the episode "Have a Summer", Adam watches Gummi Bears on a TV.
 DuckTales (2017–2021): In the episode "From the Confidential Case Files of Agent 22!", the Gummi Bears make a cameo while gummiberry juice factors into the episode's plot.
 Chip 'n Dale: Rescue Rangers (2022): Zummi Gummi appears in the film's end credits.

References

External links

Adventures of the Gummi Bears DVD (seasons 1-3)
The Great Site of Gummi – large resource of Gummi Bears information
Volume 1 DVD review with episode guide and Pictures at UltimateDisney.com
Gummi Bears at Don Markstein's Toonopedia. Archived from the original on September 1, 2016.
Gummi Bears daily comic strip at the INDUCKS
Gummi Bears Sunday comic strip at the INDUCKS

1980s American animated television series
1985 American television series debuts
1991 American television series endings
1990s American animated television series
American Broadcasting Company original programming
American children's animated action television series
American children's animated adventure television series
American children's animated fantasy television series
American children's animated comedy television series
Disney Channel original programming
English-language television shows
First-run syndicated television programs in the United States
NBC original programming
Animated television series about bears
Television series by Disney Television Animation
Television series set in fictional countries
Gummi Bears
Gummi Bears
Disney comic strips
Television series created by Jymn Magon